Barbara Claßen (23 November 1957 – 13 June 1990) was a German judoka. She won the bronze medal in the -72 kg class at the 1988 Summer Olympics, where women's judo appeared as a demonstration sport for the first time. At the age of 32 Claßen committed suicide.

References

External links
 

1957 births
1990 deaths
German female judoka
Olympic judoka of West Germany
Judoka at the 1988 Summer Olympics
World judo champions
1990 suicides
20th-century German women